Ceratomia sonorensis, the Sonoran sphinx, is a moth of the  family Sphingidae. It is known from high altitudes in oak and oak-pine associations in Madrean woodland in Sonora, Mexico and in south-eastern  Arizona.

The wingspan is 84–89 mm. The upperside of the forewing is mostly dark gray, while the upperside of the hindwing is mostly dark brown.

There is one generation per year with adults on wing from July to August.

The larvae feed on Fraxinus species.

References

Ceratomia
Moths described in 1971